Anta P'unqu (Quechua anta copper, p'unqu pond, reservoir, tank; dam, "copper pond", also spelled Antapongo) is a mountain in the Cordillera Central in the Andes of Peru which reaches a height of approximately . It is located in the Lima Region, Yauyos Province, Huantán District. Anta P'unqu lies northwest of Paquchi.

References 

Mountains of Peru
Mountains of Lima Region